Conservative Anabaptism includes theologically conservative Anabaptist denominations, both in doctrine and practice. Conservative Anabaptists, along with Old Order Anabaptists and assimilated mainline Anabaptists, are a subset of the Anabaptist branch of Christianity. 

Conservative Anabaptists adhere to Anabaptist doctrine, such as the belief in nonresistance and the observance of plain dress (including the headcovering), while making judicious use of modern technology. Ordinances commonly observed in many Conservative Anabaptist churches include "baptism, communion, footwashing, marriage, anointing with oil, the holy kiss, and the prayer covering."

Conservative Anabaptists may have Sunday school, hold revival meetings, or operate their own Christian schools (parochial schools). Additionally, Conservative Anabaptist fellowships are often engaged in evangelism and missionary work; a 1993 report showed that Conservative Anabaptist denominations in general grew by fifty percent overall within the previous fifteen years. 

Among Conservative Anabaptists are the Dunkard Brethren Church, Old Brethren Church, and Conservative Mennonites (inclusive of the Beachy Mennonites), as well as the Bruderhof Communities, Apostolic Christian Church and the Charity Christian Fellowship. Conservative Anabaptists form 15% of Anabaptist Christianity as a whole.

In response to a perceived laxity in adherence to Anabaptist doctrine and practice, certain Conservative Anabaptist denominations, such as the Biblical Mennonite Alliance and the Dunkard Brethren Church, were formed after adherents separated from their parent (usually mainline Anabaptist) bodies; on the other hand, the Beachy Mennonites are composed of individuals who left Old Order Anabaptist groups and "were deeply committed to evangelism and mission work." Other Conservative Anabaptist denominations, such as Charity Christian Fellowship, have been organized by people from diverse backgrounds.

Beside The Still Waters is a daily devotional widely used by Conservative Anabaptists.

References

Further reading

External links 
 Conservative Anabaptist Places
 Pilgrim Ministry: Conservative Mennonite Anabaptist churches
 Biblical Mennonite Alliance
 Beachy Amish
 Dunkard Brethren Church
 Charity Christian Fellowship
 Apostolic Christian Church
  Apostolic Christian Church (Nazarean)
 Statement of Beliefs - Anabaptist Disciples of Christ
 Christian Aid Ministries

Anabaptism
Conservative Anabaptists